From Here to the Hearse is a 2010 limited edition vinyl compilation album released by American musician Wednesday 13. It features songs from his horror punk solo career and his various side projects such as his outlaw country project Bourbon Crow, his glam metal project Gunfire 76 and covers from his previous band Frankenstein Drag Queens From Planet 13. It was a limited release only seeing 1,000 copies being made in the US. The album title is taken from the track of the same name on Wednesday's Skeletons album.

Background
The album features five studio tracks from his solo career with "It's a Wonderful Lie" being a previously unreleased Digital only single. It also features 1 live track from his solo career "197666" which is a cover from his previous band Frankenstein Drag Queens From Planet 13. The album also features 2 tracks from Bourbon Crow and 2 tracks from Gunfire 76. The artwork was handled by Marlene Elizabeth and the photos were handled by James Williams from Razorstrike.com.

Track listing
Side 1
 Gimmie Gimmie Bloodshed - 2:19 (Wednesday 13 - Skeletons)
 From Here to the Hearse - 3:21 (Wednesday 13 - Skeletons)
 B-Movie Babylon - 5:02 (Wednesday 13 - Bloodwork)
 I Love to Say Fuck - 6:22 (Wednesday 13 - Bloodwork) (2007 Version)
 Suck My Dixie - 2:11 (Bourbon Crow - Highway to Hangovers)
Side 2
 Long Way to the Bottom - 2:54 (Bourbon Crow - Long Way to the Bottom)
 197666 (live) - 2:54 (Wednesday 13 - Frankenstein Drag Queens From Planet 13 cover)
 Los Angel-Less - 4:27 (Gunfire 76 - Casualties & Tragedies)
 One More Reason - 3:52 (Gunfire 76 - Casualties & Tragedies)
 It's a Wonderful Lie - 4:10 (Wednesday 13 - Xanaxtasy digital single)

References

2010 compilation albums
Wednesday 13 albums